Quảng Tín was a province of South Vietnam.  It was created from Quảng Nam's Quế Sơn District on July 31, 1962. The capital was Tam Kỳ.  

As of the 1965 census the province had a population of 361,097 inhabitants, divided among six districts (quận), 86 communes (xã) and 419 hamlets (ấp).

During the Vietnam War it was the site of heavy fighting, including Operation Union I & II. The province was remerged with Quảng Nam following the unification of the Socialist Republic of Vietnam on July 2, 1976.

References

Quảng Nam province
1962 establishments in South Vietnam
South Vietnam
Provinces of South Vietnam